The Senate, literally "Senate of the Parliament of the Czech Republic", is the upper house of the Parliament of the Czech Republic. The seat of the Senate is Wallenstein Palace in Prague.

Structure

The Senate has 81 members, chosen in single-seat constituencies through the two-round system. If no candidate receives a majority of votes in the first round, there is a second round between the two highest-placed candidates. The term of office for Senators is six years, and elections are staggered so that a third of the seats are up for election every two years. A candidate for the Senate does not need to be on a political party's ticket (unlike in the Chamber of Deputies).

The Senate has one President and four Vice-presidents. Its members participate in specialised committees and commissions. The Senate Chancellery has been created to provide professional, organisational and technical services. The Senate occupies several historical palaces in centre of Prague, in Malá Strana quarter. In 2005 its budget was 561.2 million CZK.

Powers
The Senate can delay a proposed law which was approved by the Chamber of Deputies but this veto can be overridden by a majority (i.e. at least 101 of all 200 members) of the Chamber of Deputies in a repeated vote. If the Senate proposes amendments, Chamber of deputies may approve it with a simple majority or override it with absolute majority. The Senate, however, cannot be overridden when it votes on electoral law, constitutional law and on international treaties.

The Senate decides on confirmation of judges of the Constitutional Court, proposed by the President. It often uses this power to block unacceptable nominants and may propose new laws. However, the Senate does not get to vote on the country's budget or on confidence in the government, unlike the Chamber of Deputies.

The President of the Senate is the second-highest official of the Czech Republic for ceremonial purposes, after the President of the Republic, but without much real political power.

History

The Senate was established in constitutional law of the Czech National Council (ČNR) No. 1/1993 on 16 December 1992. The immediate reason for its creation was a need to find a place for members of the Federal Assembly, dissolved together with Czechoslovakia. Other reasons given were the positioning of the Senate as a safety device ("pojistka") correcting laws endorsed by lower chamber and as a power balancing tool against the dominance of a single party, especially regarding constitution and electoral law.
Due to opposition by the Civic Democratic Alliance (who had members in the Czech National Council, which became the Chamber of Deputies under the new Constitution, but not in the Federal Assembly) and those politicians fearing dilution of power the Senate was not set up. The first elections were held in 1996, with voter turnout around 35% (much lower than turnout for the lower chamber). Further elections were held in accordance with the Constitution every two years after that.

The Senate has received criticism for being essentially powerless and unnecessary for a country of the size of the Czech Republic. However, the likely most prominent critic of Czech Senate, former prime minister Andrej Babiš, has expressed his plan to change the electoral into Chamber of Deputies into First-past-the-post voting, something that cannot be done without consent of the Senate, plus the Czech Constitution prohibits such system for lower chamber.

Latest election results
Results of the 2022 Czech Senate election.

Elected senators

Current composition of the Senate

See also
President of the Senate of the Czech Republic
List of presidents of the Senate of the Czech Republic

Notes

References

External links
Official website

 
Senate
Czech Republic, Senate of the
1996 establishments in the Czech Republic